Nicrophorus humator is a burying beetle described by Gleditsch in 1767 (as Silpha humator).  It has a Palearctic distribution, including North Africa. A fossil dating to around 10,500 years ago was described in 1962 by Pearson.

References

Silphidae
Beetles of Asia
Beetles of Europe
Beetles of North Africa
Beetles described in 1767